The Saturn Award for Best Horror Television Series is one of the annual awards given by the American Academy of Science Fiction, Fantasy & Horror Films. The Saturn Awards, which are the oldest film and series-specialized awards to reward science fiction, fantasy, and horror achievements, included the category for the first time at the 42nd Saturn Awards ceremony, when the Saturn Award went through major changes in their television categories. It specifically rewards horror on television.

Since the award was introduced in 2016, The Walking Dead has been the only series to win. In 2019, the award received a sister category: Best Streaming Horror/Thriller Television Series.

Winners and nominees 
The winners are listed in bold.

(NOTE: Year refers to year of eligibility, the actual ceremonies are held the following year)

2010s

2020s

Most nominations
 6 nominations – Fear the Walking Dead, The Walking Dead
 5 nominations – American Horror Story
 3 nominations – Ash vs Evil Dead, Teen Wolf, What We Do in the Shadows
 2 nominations – Creepshow, Evil, Preacher, Servant, The Strain

Most wins
 6 wins – The Walking Dead

See also
 Saturn Award for Best Streaming Horror & Thriller Series

References

External links
 Official site

Saturn Awards